Lions Gibraltar is a professional football club in Gibraltar. They play in the country's top-level league, the Gibraltar National League.

They were created by a merger of Gibraltar United F.C. and Lions FC in 2011. Aside from their first team, they also run an intermediate (under-23) team, several youth teams, futsal teams and a women's team.

History
Lions Gibraltar was founded as Lions Football Club in 1966 when a group of friends decided to take up a team after the euphoria of England winning the 1966 World Cup, thus the three lions on its club badge. After a quiet 45-year history, the club merged with league giants Gibraltar United in 2011 to create a much stronger side.

Their time together saw the side consistently compete in the Gibraltar Premier Division, and the side continued this upon the GFA's admittance to UEFA in 2013. The 2013–14 season, their final season united with Gibraltar United, saw them narrowly avoid a relegation playoff with a 6th-place finish. After this, Gibraltar United joined the Gibraltar Second Division and Lions restructured, with English coach Jeff Wood appointed manager with ambitions to challenge the top sides and qualify for the UEFA Europa League. In February 2015 the club announced plans to become a feeder club with Premier League club Swansea City, although these plans eventually fell through.

However, after a disappointing season in which the club finished bottom of the league (avoiding relegation due to the league's expansion), the club announced in July 2015 that it was to be taken over by Hercules Sports Promotion, Ltd, headed by Andrew Flowers (who had previously attempted to purchase Leeds United in 2013). Significant investment by the new ownership meant that Lions would now become a semi-professional club with the aim of toppling Lincoln Red Imps' dominance. The following season saw immediate improvement, with the club finishing 4th, however they remained significantly off the pace compared to the region's top two sides Lincoln Red Imps and Europa.

On 31 May, the board announced former national team coach David Wilson as their new manager for the 2016–17 season. However, after the collapse of the club owners' other companies left Lions' future uncertain, Wilson resigned before the beginning of the season to take over at FCB Magpies and the previous season's co-caretaker Rafael Bado was announced as manager. A season spent primarily in the bottom two ended in safety, however, after an upturn in form from the beginning of 2017 despite only winning one game in the first 4 months of the season.

Seasons (since UEFA acceptance)

Current squad

First team

Intermediate League squad
Players below are registered to play in the Gibraltar Intermediate League. Players from the first team may also appear for this team. Correct as of 17 December 2020.

Club staff

See also
Lions Gibraltar F.C. Women

Notes

References

External links
 Official website
 

Association football clubs established in 1966
Football clubs in Gibraltar
Gibraltar National League clubs
1966 establishments in Gibraltar